The 2014 Louisiana–Lafayette Ragin' Cajuns baseball team represented the University of Louisiana at Lafayette in the 2014 NCAA Division I baseball season. The Ragin' Cajuns played their home games at M. L. Tigue Moore Field and were led by twentieth year head coach Tony Robichaux.

Preseason

Sun Belt Conference Coaches Poll
The Sun Belt Conference Coaches Poll was released on February 10, 2014. Louisiana-Lafayette was picked to finish first in the Sun Belt with 98 votes and 8 first-place votes.

Preseason All-Sun Belt team

Austin Robichaux (ULL, JR, Pitcher)
Matt Bell (USA, SR, Pitcher)
Shane McCain (TROY, SR, Pitcher)
Ian Tompkins (WKU, JR, Pitcher)
Michael Strentz (ULL, RS-JR, Catcher)
Zach George (ARST, RS-JR, 1st Base)
Caden Bailey (GSU, JR, 2nd Base)
Blake Trahan (ULL, SO, Shortstop)
Tyler Girouard (ULL, JR, 3rd Base)
Seth Harrison (ULL, SR, Outfield)
Matt Shortall (UTA, SR, Outfield)
Regan Flaherty (WKU, SR, Outfield)
Caleb Adams (ULL, JR, Designated Hitter)
Scott Wilcox (WKU, SR, Utility)

2015 Sun Belt Preseason Player of the Year
Caleb Adams (ULL, JR, Designated Hitter)

2015 Sun Belt Preseason Pitcher of the Year
Austin Robichaux (ULL, JR, Pitcher)

Roster

Coaching staff

Schedule and results

Lafayette Regional

Lafayette Super Regional

References

Louisiana-Lafayette
Louisiana Ragin' Cajuns baseball seasons
Louisiana-Lafayette baseball
2014 NCAA Division I baseball tournament participants
Sun Belt Conference baseball champion seasons